Ecobank Uganda is a bank in Uganda that operates as a commercial bank under a license granted by the Bank of Uganda, the central bank and national banking regulator.

Location
The headquarters of Ecobank Uganda are located at Plot 8A, Kafu Road, in the Central Division of Kampala, the capital and largest city of Uganda. The coordinates of the bank's headquarters are 0°18'47.0"N, 32°35'06.0"E (Latitude:0.32662; Longitude:32.58310).

Overview
The bank began operations in Uganda on 19 January 2009 as a full-service bank. It provides wholesale, retail, investment, and transaction banking services and products to governments, financial institutions, multinationals, international organizations, businesses, and individuals.

As of 31 December 2014, the bank's total assets were UGX:278.8 billion, with shareholders' equity of UGX:46.9 billion.

Ownership
Ecobank Uganda is a subsidiary of Ecobank Transnational, a banking conglomerate headquartered in Lome, Togo.

Board of directors
The following individuals sat on the board of directors of Ecobank (Uganda) as of 30 November 2021:
 Kin Kariisa, chairman
 Ehoumann Kasi, non-executive director
 Gertrude K. Lutaaya, non-executive director
 
 Grace Muliisa, Managing Director

Management
Grace Muliisa is the managing director of Ecobank Uganda. Who is Grace Muliisa, The New Ecobank Managing Director?

Branch network
As of December 2016, Ecobank Uganda maintained networked branches at the following locations:

 Bombo Road Branch - Bombo Road, Kampala
 Kireka Service Centre
 EntebbeBranch - Entebbe Town
 Lugogo Branch - Forest Mall, 3A2 & 3A3 Sports Lane, Lugogo, Kampala
 Head Office Branch - Parliament Avenue, Kampala
 Jinja Branch - Jinja
 Kikuubo Branch - Nakivubo Road, Kampala
 Mbarara Branch, Main street Mbarara town
 Nakasero Branch - Rwenzori Towers, Nakasero Road, Nakasero, Kampala
 Ndeeba Branch - Masaka Road, Ndeeba, Kampala
 Oasis Mall Branch - Oasis Mall, Yusuf Lule Road, Kampala
 Wandegeya Branch - Bombo Road, Wandegeya, Kampala

See also

 Ecobank
 Ecobank Ghana
 Ecobank Nigeria
 Ecobank Zimbabwe
 Charles Mbire
 List of banks in Uganda
 Banking in Uganda

References

External links
  Ecobank Website
 Ecobank Involved In  Oil & Gas Sector Financing

Banks of Uganda
Banks established in 2009
2009 establishments in Uganda
Banking in Uganda
Companies based in Kampala